Joseph Matthew Alwyn (born 21 February 1991) is an English actor. He made his feature film debut as the titular character in Ang Lee's 2016 war drama, Billy Lynn's Long Halftime Walk, and has since played supporting roles in films such as The Favourite (2018), Boy Erased (2018), Mary Queen of Scots (2018), and Harriet (2019). His accolades include a Trophée Chopard, a Critics' Choice Movie Award, a Satellite Award, and a Grammy Award.

Born in Tunbridge Wells, Kent, England, and raised in North London, Alwyn developed an interest in acting during his teenage years and joined the National Youth Theatre in 2009. He acted in two student productions at Edinburgh Festival Fringe, and graduated with a BA degree in English literature and drama from the University of Bristol (2012). He received another BA, in acting, from the Royal Central School of Speech and Drama (2015). He won the Trophée Chopard at the 2018 Cannes Film Festival, following his appearance in various critically acclaimed films.

Alwyn also worked with American singer-songwriter Taylor Swift in 2020–2022 on ten of her songs, such as "Exile", "Betty", "Champagne Problems", "Coney Island" and "Sweet Nothing"; "Exile" charted inside the top 10 in eight countries. For his contributions to Swift's eighth studio album, Folklore, Alwyn won the Album of the Year at the 63rd Annual Grammy Awards.

In 2022, Alwyn starred in three well-received adaptations—Hulu drama series Conversations with Friends, the romantic thriller film Stars at Noon which won the Grand Prix at the 2022 Cannes Film Festival, and the period comedy film Catherine Called Birdy. He appeared on the 2022 Time 100 Next list as one of the world's rising stars.

Early life and education 
Joseph Matthew Alwyn was born on 21 February 1991 in Tunbridge Wells, Kent, England. Raised in Tufnell Park and Crouch End areas of North London, Alwyn is the son of a psychotherapist mother and a documentary filmmaker father. He is the great-grandson of composer William Alwyn.

Alwyn was educated at the City of London School. He briefly took guitar lessons, and was part of the school band called "Anger Management" around the age 13. He later played football and rugby in school. Although an "introverted" child, Alwyn secretly wanted to be an actor and became a member of the National Youth Theatre in his late teens. While pursuing Bachelor of Arts (BA) in English literature and drama at the University of Bristol, he acted in two student productions at the Edinburgh Fringe Festival. He graduated in 2012, and applied for four drama schools, but got rejected by all except one—the Royal Central School of Speech & Drama, where he completed a BA, in acting. During the third year of the course, Alwyn signed with an agent who had come across Alwyn at a student showcase. Soon after, the agent informed Alwyn that a production company was looking to cast the title character of Billy Lynn's Long Halftime Walk (2016), which would go on to mark Alwyn's debut in a feature film.

Career

Acting 
Within a fortnight of his graduate showcase, in early 2015, Alwyn was cast in the lead role of Taiwanese director Ang Lee's 2016 war drama film, Billy Lynn's Long Halftime Walk, which is a film adaptation based on the 2012 novel of the same name by American writer Ben Fountain. Lee stated he selected Alwyn because of his "ability to communicate the book's paradox of war with just his facial expressions". In the film's reviews, critics praised Alwyn's performance for its naturalism. Journalists went on to describe the film as his "breakout". He then played a supporting role in the 2017 mystery drama film, The Sense of an Ending, directed by Indian filmmaker Ritesh Batra.

Alwyn appeared in a number of 2018 films. He played the British nobleman Samuel Masham, alongside actors Olivia Colman, Rachel Weisz, Emma Stone and Nicholas Hoult, in the period black comedy film, The Favourite, directed by Greek filmmaker Yorgos Lanthimos. The film garnered 10 nominations at the 91st Academy Awards. He portrayed Klaus Eichmann, son of German Nazi official Adolf Eichmann, in Chris Weitz's historical drama Operation Finale, featuring Oscar Isaac and Ben Kingsley in the lead roles, and a minor role in Joel Edgerton's Boy Erased—a biographical drama film based on a 2016 memoir by American LGBT+ activist Garrard Conley. Alwyn then appeared as English statesman Robert Dudley, the favourite of Queen Elizabeth I, in the historical drama Mary Queen of Scots, alongside Saoirse Ronan as Queen Mary and Margot Robbie as Elizabeth. Acknowledging his talent, Alwyn was awarded the Trophée Chopard alongside Australian actress Elizabeth Debicki at the 2018 Cannes Film Festival.

In 2019, Alwyn played a slave owner named Gideon Brodess in Harriet, a biographical drama about American abolitionist Harriet Tubman, starring Cynthia Erivo and Janelle Monáe. He appeared as Bob Cratchit in the dark fantasy television miniseries A Christmas Carol, based on the 1843 novella of the same name by English writer Charles Dickens. In 2021, he had a minor role in drama film The Souvenir Part II, and played a 1960s industrialist in the film adaptation of English novelist Jojo Moyes' 2008 romantic novel, The Last Letter from Your Lover, alongside Felicity Jones, Callum Turner and Shailene Woodley.

Leading opposite Jemima Kirke and Sasha Lane, Alwyn appeared in the 2022 drama series Conversations with Friends—a Hulu adaptation of the 2017 novel of the same name by Irish author Sally Rooney. He also appeared in two 2022 films: paired with Margaret Qualley in the romantic thriller film Stars at Noon, directed by French filmmaker Claire Denis, and as the uncle of the titular character (played by Bella Ramsey) in Lena Dunham's medieval comedy film, Catherine Called Birdy, based on the 1994 children's novel of the same name by American writer Karen Cushman; both the films were met with generally positive reviews, with the former premiering at the 2022 Cannes Film Festival and winning the Grand Prix.

Alwyn has been cast alongside Riz Ahmed in Aneil Karia's upcoming "modern" adaptation of William Shakespeare's Hamlet, as well as in And, an upcoming anthology film directed by Greek filmmaker Yorogos Lanthimos, also starring Stone, Qualley and Willem Dafoe.

Music 
Alwyn explored his music prospects with American singer-songwriter and girlfriend, Taylor Swift. He explained that he had not planned on working with Swift, but "it came about from messing around on a piano, and singing badly," and then "being overheard by Swift, and being, like, 'Let's see what happens if we get to the end of it together'." He co-produced the songs "Exile", "Betty", "My Tears Ricochet", "August", "This Is Me Trying" and "Illicit Affairs" on Swift's eighth studio album, Folklore (2020); he also co-wrote "Exile" and "Betty", under the pseudonym William Bowery. "Exile" reached the top 10 of the charts in various countries, including number six on the US Billboard Hot 100 and number eight on the UK Singles Chart. At the 63rd Annual Grammy Awards in 2021, "Exile" was nominated for the Grammy Award for Best Pop Duo/Group Performance, while Folklore won the Album of the Year, garnering Alwyn his first Grammy win. He (as Bowery) also co-wrote "Champagne Problems", "Coney Island" and the title track on Swift's second 2020 album, Evermore. In April 2022, Alwyn revealed to The Wall Street Journal that the name "William Bowery" was derived from the first name of his great grandfather William Alwyn, who was a music composer, and the last name in honor of the New York City neighbourhood Bowery, where he had spent "a lot of time" when he first arrived to the U.S. He worked with Swift on her tenth studio album, Midnights (2022), as well, co-writing its penultimate track, "Sweet Nothing", as Bowery.

Personal life
Alwyn keeps his personal life mostly discreet, which he self-described as a "knee-jerk response to the culture we live in". He dislikes media's invasion of privacy. GQ labelled Alwyn a "notoriously low-key actor". The Wall Street Journal went on to call him "Hollywood's Most Private Leading Man". Since 2016, Alwyn has been in a relationship with Taylor Swift. Media outlets have taken note of the privacy Alwyn and Swift maintain about their relationship, as Swift was more open about her romantic life in the past. Nevertheless, their relationship is a subject of constant tabloid scrutiny. Swift's 2022 song "Lavender Haze" discusses the rumors about the relationship. 

In April 2022, when Elle questioned Alwyn about his discretion, he replied "It's not really [because I] want to be guarded and private, it's more a response to something else. We live in a culture that is so increasingly intrusive... the more you give—and frankly, even if you don't give it—something will be taken." Commenting on rumors about alleged engagement with Swift, Alwyn told The Wall Street Journal: "If I had a pound for every time I think I've been told I've been engaged, then I'd have a lot of pound coins. I mean, the truth is, if the answer was yes, I wouldn't say, and if the answer was no, I wouldn't say."

Accolades 

Alwyn also has appeared in the 2022 Time 100 Next, a listicle by Time recognizing "100 rising stars from across industries and around the world."

Filmography

Film

Television

Discography

See also 
 List of British actors

Footnotes

References

External links 

 

21st-century English male actors
Alumni of the Royal Central School of Speech and Drama
Alumni of the University of Bristol
English male film actors
English male stage actors
English male songwriters
Grammy Award winners
Living people
National Youth Theatre members
People educated at the City of London School
Male actors from London
1991 births
Chopard Trophy for Male Revelation winners